Anatoly Stepanovich Tyazhlov (October 11, 1942 – July 28, 2008) was a Russian politician who served as the Governor of Moscow Oblast from 1991 until 2000.

Tyazhlov was born in the city of Kopeysk in the South Ural. Before entering politics, he worked in construction organizations in the Chelyabinsk, Orenburg and Moscow regions. He graduated from the Chelyabinsk Polytechnic Institute in 1964. From 1959 to 1969 he worked as a fitter at the Kopeysk Coal trust, as a bricklayer at the Chelyabinsk Civil Construction trust, then as a foreman, technologist, shop manager, head of department, chief engineer of the Orenburg precast concrete plant.

Until August 1991 he was a member of the CPSU. In 1990–91 — Chairman of the Executive Committee of the Moscow Regional Council. On 16 October 1991, by decree of the President of Russia Boris Yeltsin, Tyazhlov was appointed Head of Administration of Moscow Oblast. On 17 December 1995, he was elected Governor of Moscow Oblast. Tyazhlov was politically close to Boris Yeltsin, Viktor Chernomyrdin and Yury Luzhkov, and he supported the integration between Moscow City and Moscow Oblast.

In 1993 he was elected as a deputy of the first Federation Council (1994–96). In 1996–99 he was an ex officio member of the second Federation Council. On 19 December 1999, at the second gubernatorial elections, he came fourth (13% of the vote) and dropped out of the race. Tyazhlov also ran for the 3rd State Duma from the Fatherland – All Russia bloc and became one of the deputies of the lower house (1999–2003).

He died on July 28, 2008, at the age of 65.

References 

1942 births
2008 deaths
People from Kopeysk
South Ural State University alumni
Members of the Federation Council of Russia (1994–1996)
Members of the Federation Council of Russia (1996–2000)
Third convocation members of the State Duma (Russian Federation)
Governors of Moscow Oblast
Burials in Troyekurovskoye Cemetery